The Somerset Monument in Hawkesbury Upton, Gloucestershire, England was built in 1846 to commemorate Lord Robert Edward Somerset. It is a Grade II* listed building, and on the Heritage at Risk register.

History

Lord Robert Edward Somerset was a British soldier who fought during the Peninsular War and the War of the Seventh Coalition. From 1830 sat for Gloucestershire and from 1834 to 1837 was MP for Cirencester.

The memorial was designed by Lewis Vulliamy, and built by staff from the nearby Badminton House estate which was the principal seat of the Dukes of Beaufort since the late 17th century.

Architecture

The structure tapers slightly and has four panelled sides. On the southern panel is the arms of the Somerset family.

At the base of the tower is a lodge and ornamental garden.

References

Grade II* listed buildings in Gloucestershire
Grade II* listed monuments and memorials
Monuments and memorials in Gloucestershire
Buildings and structures in South Gloucestershire District
Structures on the Heritage at Risk register